Jackson Glacier is approximately the seventh largest of the remaining 25 glaciers in Glacier National Park located in the US state of Montana. A part of the largest grouping of glaciers in the park, Jackson Glacier rests on the north side of Mount Jackson. Between 1966 and 2005, Jackson Glacier lost almost a third of its acreage. When the two mountains were united prior to their separation sometime before 1929, they were known simply as Blackfoot Glacier. In 1850, there were an estimated 150 glaciers in the park. Glaciologists have stated that by the year 2030, many if not all of the glaciers in the park may disappear completely. Jackson and Blackfoot glaciers have been selected for monitoring by the U.S. Geological Survey's Glacier Monitoring Research program, which is researching changes to the mass balance of glaciers in and surrounding Glacier National Park. The glacier is being monitored using remote sensing equipment and repeat photography, where images of the glacier are taken from identical locations periodically. Jackson Glacier is one of the easiest of the park's glaciers to observe, and is located south of the Going-to-the-Sun Road on the east side of the Continental Divide, upper St. Mary Valley.

See also
 List of glaciers in the United States
 Glaciers in Glacier National Park (U.S.)

References

Glaciers of Glacier County, Montana
Glaciers of Glacier National Park (U.S.)
Glaciers of Montana